Cyclophora subdolaria is a moth in the family Geometridae first described by Charles Swinhoe in 1886. It is found in India and New Guinea.

References

Moths described in 1886
Cyclophora (moth)
Moths of Asia
Moths of New Guinea